Colleen Malone was a New Zealand sprinter.

In the 1950 British Empire Games she competed in the 100 yards event, being eliminated in the semifinal.

External links
 

Possibly living people
Year of birth missing (living people)
Commonwealth Games competitors for New Zealand
Athletes (track and field) at the 1950 British Empire Games
New Zealand female sprinters